Alton Jones may refer to:
 W. Alton Jones (1891–1962), American industrialist and philanthropist
 Alton Jones Jr., American bass fisherman
 Alton Jones (racing driver)